Ladislaus I (1040 – 29 July 1095), also known as Saint Ladislas, was King of Hungary from 1077 and King of Croatia from 1091. He was the second son of King Béla I of Hungary and Richeza (or Adelaide) of Poland. After Béla's death in 1063, Ladislaus and his elder brother, Géza, acknowledged their cousin Solomon as the lawful king in exchange for receiving their father's former duchy, which included one-third of the kingdom. They cooperated with Solomon for the next decade. Ladislaus's most popular legend, which narrates his fight with a "Cuman" (a Turkic nomad marauder) who abducted a Hungarian girl, is connected to this period. The brothers' relationship with Solomon deteriorated in the early 1070s, and they rebelled against him. Géza was proclaimed king in 1074, but Solomon maintained control of the western regions of his kingdom. During Géza's reign, Ladislaus was his brother's most influential adviser.

Géza died in 1077, and his supporters made Ladislaus king. Solomon resisted Ladislaus with assistance from King Henry IV of Germany. Ladislaus supported Henry IV's opponents during the Investiture Controversy. In 1081, Solomon abdicated and acknowledged Ladislaus's reign, but he conspired to regain the royal crown, and Ladislaus imprisoned him. Ladislaus canonized the first Hungarian saints (including his distant relatives, King Stephen I and Duke Emeric) in 1085. He set Solomon free during the canonization ceremony.

After a series of civil wars, Ladislaus's main focus was the restoration of public safety. He introduced severe legislation, punishing those who violated property rights with death or mutilation. He occupied almost all Croatia in 1091, which marked the beginning of an expansion period for the medieval Kingdom of Hungary. Ladislaus's victories over the Pechenegs and Cumans ensured the security of his kingdom's eastern borders for about 150 years. His relationship with the Holy See deteriorated during the last years of his reign, as the popes claimed that Croatia was their fief, but Ladislaus denied their claims.

Ladislaus was canonized on 27 June 1192 by Pope Celestine III. Legends depict him as a pious knight-king, "the incarnation of the late-medieval Hungarian ideal of chivalry." He is a popular saint in Hungary and neighboring nations, where many churches are dedicated to him.

Early years (before 1064) 

Ladislaus was the second son of the future King Béla I of Hungary and his wife, Richeza (or Adelaide), who was a daughter of King Mieszko II Lambert of Poland. Ladislaus and his elder brother, Géza, were born in Poland, where Béla had settled in the 1030s after being banished from Hungary. Ladislaus was born around 1040. Ladislaus's "physical and spiritual makeup testified to God's gracious will even at his birth", according to his late-12th-century Legend. The almost contemporaneous Gallus Anonymus wrote that Ladislaus was "raised from childhood in Poland" and almost became a "Pole in his ways and life". He received a Slavic name: "Ladislaus" is derived from "Vladislav".

Béla and his family returned to Hungary around 1048. Béla received the so-called "Duchy"which encompassed one-third of the kingdomfrom his brother, King Andrew I of Hungary. The Illuminated Chronicle mentions that Andrew's son, Solomon, "was anointed king with the consent of Duke Bela and his sons Geysa and Ladislaus" in 1057 or 1058.

Béla, who had been Andrew's heir before Solomon's coronation, left for Poland in 1059; his sons accompanied him. They returned with Polish reinforcements and began a rebellion against Andrew. After defeating Andrew, Béla was crowned king on 6 December 1060. Solomon left the country, taking refuge in the Holy Roman Empire. Béla I died on 11 September 1063, some time before German troops entered Hungary in order to restore Solomon. Ladislaus and his brothers, Géza and Lampert, went back to Poland, and Solomon was once again crowned king in Székesfehérvár. The three brothers returned when the Germans left Hungary. To avoid another civil war, the brothers signed a treaty with Solomon on 20 January 1064, acknowledging Solomon's reign in exchange for their father's duchy.

Duke in Hungary (1064–1077) 

Ladislaus and Géza probably divided the administration of their duchy; Ladislaus seems to have received the regions around Bihar (now Biharia, Romania). Géza and Ladislaus cooperated with King Solomon between 1064 and 1071. The most popular story in Ladislaus's later legendshis fight with a "Cuman" warrior who abducted a Christian maidenoccurred during this period. The relationship between the king and his cousins became tense in the early 1070s. When Géza accompanied Solomon on a military campaign against the Byzantine Empire in 1072, Ladislaus stayed behind with half of the ducal troops in Nyírség to "avenge his brother with a strong hand" if Solomon harmed Géza.

Realizing that another civil war was inevitable, the king and dukes launched negotiations to obtain the assistance of foreign powers. First, Ladislaus visited the Kievan Rus', but he returned without reinforcements. He then went to Moravia, and persuaded Duke Otto I of Olomouc to accompany him back to Hungary with Czech troops. By the time they returned to Hungary, the royal army had already invaded the duchy and routed Géza's troops at the Battle of Kemej on 26 February 1074. Ladislaus met his fleeing brother at Vác, and they decided to continue the fight against Solomon. A legend preserved in the Illuminated Chronicle mentions that before the battle, Ladislaus "saw in broad daylight a vision from heaven" of an angel placing a crown on Géza's head. Another legendary episode also predicted the dukes' triumph over the king: an "ermine of purest white" jumped from a thorny bush to Ladislaus's lance and then onto his chest. The decisive Battle of Mogyoród was fought on 14 March 1074. Ladislaus commanded "the troops from Byhor" on the left flank. Solomon was defeated, but instead of surrendering to his cousins, he fled to the western borders of the kingdom to seek assistance from his brother-in-law Henry IV of Germany.

Géza was proclaimed king, but Solomon established himself in Moson and Pressburg (now Bratislava, Slovakia). During his brother's reign, Ladislaus administered all of their father's former duchy. He repelled Solomon's attack on Nyitra (present-day Nitra, Slovakia) in August or September 1074, but he could not seize Pressburg. Ladislaus was also his brother's main advisor. Legend says that Géza decided to build a church dedicated to the Holy Virgin in Vác after Ladislaus explained the significance of the wondrous appearance of a red deer at the place where the church would be erected:

His reign

Consolidation (1077–1085) 

Géza I died on 25 April 1077. Since Géza's sons, Coloman and Álmos, were minors, his supporters proclaimed Ladislaus king instead. Gallus Anonymus emphasizes that King Boleslaus II the Bold of Poland "drove out" Solomon "from Hungary with his forces, and placed [Ladislaus] on the throne"; Boleslaus even called Ladislaus "his king". Although the Illuminated Chronicle emphasizes that Ladislaus "never placed the crown upon his head, for he desired a heavenly crown rather than the earthly crown of a mortal king", all his coins depict him wearing a crown, suggesting that Ladislaus was actually crowned around 1078. Shortly after his coronation, Ladislaus promulgated two law books, which incorporated the decisions of an assembly of the "magnates of the kingdom", held in Pannonhalma. The majority of these laws were draconian measures to defend private property, showing that Ladislaus primarily focused on internal consolidation and security during the first years of his reign. Those who were caught stealing were to be executed, and even criminals who committed minor offenses against property rights were blinded or sold as slaves. His other laws regulated legal proceedings and economic matters, including the issuing of judicial summons and the royal monopoly on salt trade.

The Illuminated Chronicle claims that Ladislaus planned to "restore the kingdom" to Solomon and "himself have the dukedom", but almost all contemporaneous sources contradict this report. Ladislaus approached Pope Gregory VII, who was the primary opponent of Solomon's ally, Henry IV of Germany. At the Pope's request, Ladislaus sheltered Bavarian nobles who had rebelled against Henry. In 1078 or 1079, Ladislaus married Adelaide, a daughter of Rudolf of Rheinfelden, whom the German princes had elected to take the place of Henry IV as king. Ladislaus supported Leopold II, Margrave of Austria, who also rebelled against Henry IV; however, the German monarch forced Leopold to surrender in May 1078.

Taking advantage of the internal conflicts in the Holy Roman Empire, Ladislaus besieged and captured the fortress of Moson from Solomon in early 1079. However, Henry IV stormed the western regions of Hungary, and secured Solomon's position. The German invasion also prevented Ladislaus from assisting Boleslaus the Bold, who fled to Hungary after his subjects expelled him from Poland. Ladislaus initiated negotiations with Solomon, who abdicated in 1080 or 1081 in exchange for "revenues sufficient to bear the expenses of a king". However, Solomon soon began conspiring against Ladislaus, and Ladislaus imprisoned him.

The first five Hungarian saints, including the first king of Hungary, Stephen I, and Stephen's son, Emeric, were canonized during Ladislaus's reign. Stephen's canonization demonstrates Ladislaus's magnanimity, because Ladislaus's grandfather, Vazul, had been blinded on Stephen's orders in the 1030s. Historian László Kontler says that the canonization ceremony, held in August 1083, was also a political act, demonstrating Ladislaus's "commitment to preserving and strengthening" the Christian state. Ladislaus even dedicated a newly established Benedictine monasterySzentjobb Abbeyto Stephen's right arm, known as the "Holy Dexter", which was miraculously found intact. Ladislaus released Solomon at the time of the ceremony; legend said that Stephen's grave could not be opened until he did so.

After his release, Solomon made a final effort to regain his crown. He persuaded a Pecheneg chieftain, Kutesk, to invade Hungary in 1085. Ladislaus defeated the invaders at the upper courses of the Tisza River.

Expansion (1085–1092) 

In August 1087, German princes who opposed Henry IV's rule held a conference in Speyer. The contemporaneous Bernold of St Blasien mentions that Ladislaus sent envoys to the meeting, and "promised that he would assist [them] with 20,000 knights, if it became necessary". Ladislaus also recognized Pope Victor III as the legitimate pope, rather than Clement III, who had been elected pope at Henry IV's initiative. However, Ladislaus provided no further support to Henry IV's opponents after he was informed of Solomon's death in 1087.

King Demetrius Zvonimir of Croatia's wife, Helen, was Ladislaus's sister. After the death of Zvonimir and his successor, Stephen II, a conflict developed between factions of Croatian noblemen. At Helen's request, Ladislaus intervened in the conflict and invaded Croatia in 1091. The same year, he wrote to Oderizius, Abbot of Monte Cassino in Italy, about his invasion. Thomas the Archdeacon's chronicle describes how Ladislaus "occupied the entire land from the River Drava to the mountains called the Iron Alps without encountering opposition". However, his opponents crowned a local nobleman, Petar Svačić, as king. Svačić fought in the Gvozd Mountains, preventing the complete conquest of Croatia. Ladislaus appointed his nephew, Álmos, to administer the occupied territory. Around the same time, Ladislaus set up a separate diocese in Slavonia, with its see in Zagreb. The bishop of the new see became the suffragan to the archbishop of Esztergom in Hungary.

Ladislaus admitted in his letter to Oderizius that he could not "promote the cause of earthly dignities without committing grave sins". Historian Bálint Hóman says that Ladislaus was referring to a developing conflict with Pope Urban II, who objected to Ladislaus's refusal to acknowledge the Holy See's suzerainty over Croatia. In the letter, Ladislaus styled himself as "king of the Hungarians and of Messia". Historian Ferenc Makk writes that the latter title referred to Moesia, implying that Ladislaus had taken the regions between the Great Morava and Drina rivers from the Byzantine Empire. No other documents refer to Ladislaus's occupation of Moesia, suggesting that if Ladislaus did occupy the region, he lost it quickly. Alexandru Madgearu says that "Messia" should rather be associated with Bosnia, which was occupied during Ladislaus's campaign against Croatia.

The Cumans invaded and plundered the eastern part of the kingdom in 1091. The invading Cumans were leading by chieftain Kapolcs, they broke first in Transylvania, then the territory between the Danube and Tisza rivers. The Cumans tried to leave Hungary with their huge booty and prisoners, but King Ladislaus reached and defeated them near the Temes river. Ladislaus offered the Christianity for the Cuman survivors, the majority of them accepted, thus the king settled them in Jászság. The rumor of the losing battle reached the Cuman camp, the Cumans threatened King Ladislaus with revenge and demanded to free the Cuman prisoners. King Ladislaus marched to the Hungarian border to prevent the next invasion. The two armies clashed near Severin, the Hungarian army was victorious, King Ladislaus killed Ákos, the Cuman chieftain. Makk argues that the Byzantines persuaded them to attack Hungary, while the Illuminated Chronicle states that the Cumans were incited by the "Ruthenians". In retaliation, the chronicle continues, Ladislaus invaded the neighboring Rus' principalities, forcing the "Ruthenians" to ask "for mercy" and to promise "that they would be faithful to him in all things". No Rus' chronicle documents Ladislaus's military action.

Bernold of St Blasien writes that Duke Welf of Bavaria prevented a conference that Emperor Henry IV "had arranged with the king of the Hungarians" in December 1092. A letter written by Henry refers to "the alliance into which [he] once entered" with Ladislaus. Pope Urban II also mentioned that the Hungarians "left the shepherds of their salvation", implying that Ladislaus had changed sides and acknowledged the legitimacy of Antipope Clement III. In the deed of the Benedictine Somogyvár Abbey, Ladislaus stated that the abbot should be obedient to him, proving that Ladislaus opposed the Church's independence, which was demanded by the Gregorian Reforms. Ladislaus personally presided over an assembly of the Hungarian prelates that met in Szabolcs on 21 May 1091. The synod recognized the legitimacy of a clergyman's first marriage, in contrast to the requirements of canon law, which states that members of the clergy may not marry at all. According to a scholarly theory, the sees of the dioceses of Kalocsa and Bihar were moved to Bács (now Bač, Serbia) and Nagyvárad (present-day Oradea, Romania), respectively, during Ladislaus's reign.

Last years (1092–1095) 

Ladislaus intervened in a conflict between Władysław I Herman, Duke of Poland, and the duke's illegitimate son, Zbigniew, on the latter's behalf. He marched to Poland and captured Herman's younger son, Boleslaus, in 1093. At Ladislaus's demand, Władysław I Herman declared Zbigniew his legitimate son. The Illuminated Chronicle also mentions that the Hungarian troops captured Cracow during Ladislaus's campaign, but the credibility of this report has been questioned.

The Illuminated Chronicle states that "messengers from France and from Spain, from England and Britain, and especially from Willermus, the brother of the King of the Franks" visited Ladislaus in Bodrog (near present-day Bački Monoštor in Serbia) on Easter 1095, asking him to lead their crusade to the Holy Land. Ladislaus's legend says that he decided "to go to Jerusalem, and to die there for Christ". The whole story was  invented, probably during the reign of King Béla III of Hungary (who was actually planning to lead a crusade to the Holy Land in the 1190s), according to historian Gábor Klaniczay. However, Ladislaus did plan to invade Bohemia, because he wanted to assist his sister's sons, Svatopluk and Otto. He became seriously ill before reaching Moravia. The Illuminated Chronicle narrates that Ladislaus, who had no sons, "called together his chief men", telling them that his brother's younger son, Álmos, "should reign after him".

Ladislaus died near the Hungarian-Bohemian border on 29 July 1095. A papal bull of Pope Paschal II in 1106 states that Ladislaus's "venerable body rests" in Somogyvár Abbey, implying that Ladislaus had been buried in Somogyvár. On the other hand, Ladislaus's late 12th-century "Legend" provides that his attendants buried him in Székesfehérvár, but the cart carrying his body "set out to Várad on its own, unassisted by any draft animal".

Family 

Historian Gyula Kristó says that Ladislaus had a first wife, but her name and family are not known. She gave birth to a daughter, whose name is also unknown. Ladislaus's daughter married Prince Iaroslav Sviatopolchich of Volhinia around 1090. Ladislaus married again in 1078, to Adelaide, a daughter of the German anti-king Rudolf of Swabia. Their only known child, Piroska, became the wife of the Byzantine Emperor John II Komnenos in 1105 or 1106.

Ladislaus's family and relatives who are mentioned in the article are shown in the following family tree.

*According to a scholarly theory suggesting that Ladislaus had two wives.

Legacy

Consolidation of the Christian monarchy 

For centuries, hagiographers and historians have emphasized Ladislaus's prominent role in the consolidation of the Christian monarchy. The chronicles also stressed his idoneitas, or personal suitability, to reign, because the legitimacy of his rule was questionable. The Illuminated Chronicle clearly states that Ladislaus knew that "the right of law between him and [Solomon] was not on his side but only the force of fact".

After Ladislaus's victories over the Pechenegs and the Cumans, the nomadic peoples of the Pontic steppes stopped invading Hungary until the Mongol invasion of 1241. Kristó suggests that the Székely peoplea community of Hungarian-speaking warriorsstarted settling the easternmost borderlands under Ladislaus. The "historic association of the Kingdom of Hungary and Croatia", which ended in 1918, began with Ladislaus's conquest of Croatia. His conquest marked the beginning of a period of Hungarian expansion, which ensured that Hungary developed into a leading Central European power during the following centuries. It became a customary rite for a newly crowned Hungarian king to make a pilgrimage to Ladislaus's shrine at Várad. Louis I of Hungary, who made many attempts to expand his territory in the Balkan Peninsula, showed a special respect for Ladislaus.

Veneration 

Gábor Klaniczay emphasizes that Ladislaus "seemed expressly designed to personify the knight-king ideal" of his age. During the reign of Ladislaus's successor, Coloman the Learned, Bishop Hartvik said that Ladislaus's "character was distinguished by the respectability of morals and remarkable for the splendor of his virtues". The so-called Gesta Ladislai regis ("The Deeds of King Ladislaus"), which are the texts about Ladislaus's life and reign preserved in 14th-century Hungarian chronicles, were written during Coloman's rule. Five significant events of Ladislaus's life, which were not included in his official legend, were only preserved in the Gesta.

The most popular story describes Ladislaus's fight with a "Cuman" warrior after the Battle of Kerlés (at present-day Chiraleș, Romania) in 1068. In the battle, the united armies of Solomon, Géza and Ladislaus routed a band of Pechenegs or Oghuz Turks who were plundering the eastern parts of the kingdom. According to the version recorded in the Illuminated Chronicle, Ladislaus spotted a pagan warrior fleeing from the battlefield with a captive Hungarian maiden. Ladislaus pursued the "Cuman", but he could not stop him. On Ladislaus's advice, the maiden pulled the warrior off his horse, allowing Ladislaus to kill the "Cuman" after a long fight on the ground. Archaeologist Gyula László says that murals depicting this legend in medieval churches preserved the elements of pagan myths, including a "struggle between forces of light and darkness".

During the reign of Stephen II of Hungary, Ladislaus's shrine in the cathedral of Várad became a preferred venue for trials by ordeal. However, it cannot be determined whether Ladislaus became subject to veneration soon after his death, or if his cult emerged after he was canonized by Béla III of Hungary on 27 June 1192. Béla had lived in the Byzantine court, where Ladislaus's daughter, Irene, was venerated as a saint.

According to Thomas the Archdeacon, Pope Innocent III declared that Ladislaus "should be enrolled in the catalogue of saints", but his report is unreliable, because Celestine III was Pope at the time. Celestine III's bulls and charters make no reference to Ladislaus's canonization, implying that Ladislaus was canonized without the Holy See's authorization. The nearly contemporaneous Regestrum Varadinense says that a bondsman, named "Tekus, son of the craftsman Dénes", opened Ladislaus's tomb at the beginning of the ceremony, after which Tekus was granted freedom. Parts of Ladislaus's head and right hand were severed so that they could be distributed as relics. The 15th-century silver reliquary that contains Ladislaus's head is displayed in the Győr Cathedral.

Ladislaus's official legend, which was compiled after 1204, attributes a number of miracles to him. According to one of his legends, a pestilence spread throughout the kingdom during Ladislaus's reign. Ladislaus prayed for a cure; he then shot an arrow into the air at random, hitting a herb which cured the illness. This plant became known as "Saint Ladislaus's herb" in Hungary.

Ladislaus is a patron saint of Hungary, especially along the borders. In particular, soldiers and the Székely people venerate him. A late medieval legend says that Ladislaus appeared at the head of a Székely army fighting against and routing a plundering band of Tatars in 1345. He is also called upon during times of pestilence. He is often depicted as a mature, bearded man wearing a royal crown and holding a long sword or banner. He is also shown on his knees before a deer, or in the company of two angels.

Gallery

See also 

 Szent László Infantry Division
 Isten, hazánkért térdelünk
 New England (medieval)

References

Sources

Primary sources 

"Bernold of St Blasien, Chronicle" (2008). In Robinson, I. S. Eleventh-Century Germany: The Swabian Chronicles. Manchester University Press. pp. 245–337. .
"Hartvic, Life of King Stephen of Hungary" (Translated by Nora Berend) (2001). In Head, Thomas. Medieval Hagiography: An Anthology. Routledge. pp. 378–398. .
"The letters of Henry IV: Henry thanks Duke Almus for his support and promises him a reward" (2000). In Imperial Lives & Letters of the Eleventh Century (Translated by Theodor E. Mommsen and Karl F. Morrison, with a historical introduction and new suggested readings by Karl F. Morrison, edited by Robert L. Benson). Columbia University Press. pp. 52–100. .
The Deeds of the Princes of the Poles (Translated and annotated by Paul W. Knoll and Frank Schaer with a preface by Thomas N. Bisson) (2003). CEU Press. .
The Hungarian Illuminated Chronicle: Chronica de Gestis Hungarorum (Edited by Dezső Dercsényi) (1970). Corvina, Taplinger Publishing. .
"The Laws of King Ladislas I (1077–1095)". In The Laws of the Medieval Kingdom of Hungary, 1000–1301 (Translated and Edited by János M. Bak, György Bónis, James Ross Sweeney with an essay on previous editions by Andor Czizmadia, Second revised edition, In collaboration with Leslie S. Domonkos) (1999). Charles Schlacks, Jr. Publishers. pp. 11–22. . . . . . (ISBN may be misprinted in the book as 88445-29-2).
Archdeacon Thomas of Split: History of the Bishops of Salona and Split (Latin text by Olga Perić, edited, translated and annotated by Damir Karbić, Mirjana Matijević Sokol and James Ross Sweeney) (2006). CEU Press. .

Secondary sources

Further reading

External links 

St. Ladislaus (in The Catholic Encyclopedia) 
St Ladislaus, King of Hungary (a painting from around 1326 in the Museo della Consolazione in Altomonte, Italy) 
Üdvözlégy, kegyelmes Szent László király (Hail, Merciful King St Ladislaus) (a hymn to King St Ladislaus) 

|-

1040s births
1095 deaths
Beatified and canonised Árpádians
Kings of Hungary
Kings of Croatia
House of Árpád
People from Kraków
Hungarian Roman Catholic saints
Polish Roman Catholic saints
Burials at Oradea Cathedral, Crişana
11th-century Christian saints
Medieval Hungarian saints
Roman Catholic royal saints
Angelic visionaries
11th-century Hungarian people
Dukes of Hungary